Shirebrook is a civil parish in the Bolsover District of Derbyshire, England.  The parish contains four listed buildings that are recorded in the National Heritage List for England.  All the listed buildings are designated at Grade II, the lowest of the three grades, which is applied to "buildings of national importance and special interest".  The parish consists of the town of Shirebrook and the surrounding area.  The listed buildings consist of a farmhouse, a church and two schools.


Buildings

References

Citations

Sources

 

Lists of listed buildings in Derbyshire